Three ships of the Hellenic Navy have borne the name Elli (Έλλη), named after the First Balkan War Battle of Elli:

  (1914–1940), a protected cruiser  
  (1947–1965), ex-Italian cruiser Eugenio di Savoia, handed over as war reparations
  (1982–present), lead ship of the s

Hellenic Navy ship names